Macon's Bill Number 2, which became law in the United States on May 14, 1810, was intended to motivate Great Britain and France to stop seizing American ships, cargoes, and crews during the Napoleonic Wars. This was a revision of the original bill by Representative Nathaniel Macon, known as Macon's Bill Number 1. Macon's Bill Number 2 was the fourth in a series of embargo measures, coming after the Non-Importation Act, the Embargo Act, and the Non-Intercourse Act (1809). Macon neither wrote the bill nor approved it. 

The law lifted all embargoes with Britain and France for three months. It stated that if either belligerent ceased disrupting American shipping, the United States would embargo the other, unless that other country also agreed to cease disrupting American shipping.

Napoleon successfully exploited the bill to further his Continental System, effectively a French embargo on Britain that France tried to enforce on continental Europe, and to damage British-American relations. A message was sent to the United States, purporting to agree to the law's demand. President James Madison, a staunch opponent of the bill, had little choice but to accept Napoleon's ostensibly sincere offer. However, as Madison suspected, Napoleon's purpose was manipulative. When Britain threatened force against the United States in response, Napoleon reneged anyway, having achieved his goal of pushing the United States and Britain closer to the eventual War of 1812.

Notes

1810 in American law
11th United States Congress
Legal history of the United States
War of 1812 legislation
United States federal trade legislation
1810 in the United States